100 Centre Street is an American legal drama created by Sidney Lumet and starring Alan Arkin, Val Avery, Bobby Cannavale, Joel de la Fuente and Paula Devicq.

Premise
The show takes its name for the Manhattan street address of the New York City Criminal Court and the Supreme Court of the State of New York, Criminal Term, for New York County.  The show aired in the United States on the A&E Network cable television channel from 2001 to 2002. Some called it a more gritty and accurate version of Law & Order, although unlike Law & Order, 100 Centre Street focused more on the personal lives of its characters. Episodes focused on the friendship between Judge Rifkind, a liberal Jew, and Judge Sims, a conservative lesbian African American, as well as the romance between Bobby and Cynthia, Ramon's infidelity to his wife Cassandra, J.J.'s potentially corrupt mob ties, Fatima's drug addiction, Rebecca Rifkind's estrangement from her father, and Spiegelman and Byrnes' political scheming.

Main cast
 Alan Arkin as Judge Joe Rifkind
 Val Avery as Sal Gentile
 Bobby Cannavale as ADA Jeremiah "J.J." Jellinek
 Joel de la Fuente as ADA Peter Davies
 Paula Devicq as ADA/private attorney Cynthia Bennington
 Manny Pérez as Legal Aid attorney Ramon Rodriguez
 LaTanya Richardson as Judge Atallah Sims
 Joseph Lyle Taylor as ADA/PI Bobby Esposito
 Michole Briana White as Legal Aid attorney Fatima Kelly
 Bill J Vlasnic as Bill, Task Force detective on Jellinek's squad

Episodes

Season 1 (2001)

Season 2 (2001–02)

Guest stars
 Sidney Armus as DA Spiegelman
 Dennis Boutsikaris as Executive ADA Gil Byrnes
 Paul Butler as Det. Willard Block
 Sarita Choudhury as ADA Julia Brooks
 Chuck Cooper as Charlie the Bridgeman (bailiff)
 Tawny Cypress as Cassandra Rodriguez
 Margo Martindale as Legal Aid supervisor Michelle Grange
 Phyllis Newman as Sarah Rifkind
 Amy Ryan as Rebecca Rifkind

Notable guest stars
 Matthew Arkin
 Jude Ciccolella
 Terry Serpico
 Anna Deavere Smith
 Floyd Vivino
 Kerry Washington
 Judy Reyes
 Eric Millegan
 Brian Scolaro

References

External links
 
 

A&E (TV network) original programming
2001 American television series debuts
2002 American television series endings
2000s American LGBT-related drama television series
English-language television shows
2000s American legal television series
Television shows set in New York City